Kvammen Chapel is a parish church of the Church of Norway in Askvoll Municipality in Vestland county, Norway. It is located in the village of Kvammen, on the southern shore of the Førdefjorden. It is one of several churches in the Askvoll parish which is part of the Sunnfjord prosti (deanery) in the Diocese of Bjørgvin. The red brick church was built in a fan-shaped design in 1977 using plans drawn up by the architect Alf Apalseth.  The church seats about 300 people.

History
As early as the 1840s, there was talk of building a church in Kvammen to replace the old Vevring Church, however this ultimately failed and a new church was built in Vevring. In the 1930s, a committee was established to work towards building a church meeting house or prayer house in the Kvammen area. The committee made significant progress, however World War II stopped the planning of the church. After the war, it took a long time to rebuild sites that had been destroyed during the war. Then, during the 1960s, Vevring municipality was dissolved and the Kvammen area became part of Askvoll Municipality. The construction of the first church building in Kvammen was finally approved in the early 1970s. It was designed by Alf Apelseth and the lead builder was Otto Olset. The new church was consecrated on 27 November 1977 by the Bishop Thor With.

Building
The church was a distinctly modern design. The roofline of the church has an oblique pyramid shape with the point located directly above the altar in the main sanctuary of the church. There is a line of skylights along the ridge of the roofline. The interior has a simple pine altar and red brick walls.

See also
List of churches in Bjørgvin

References

Askvoll
Churches in Vestland
Fan-shaped churches in Norway
Brick churches in Norway
20th-century Church of Norway church buildings
Churches completed in 1977
1977 establishments in Norway